Isaac James Gould (November 13, 1839 – June 6, 1915) was an Ontario farmer, businessman and political figure. He represented Ontario North in the Legislative Assembly of Ontario from 1883 to 1890 and Ontario West in the House of Commons of Canada from 1900 to 1904 as a Liberal member.

He was born in Uxbridge, Ontario in 1839, the son of Joseph Gould who was a member of the assembly for the Province of Canada. In 1862, he married Rebecca Chapman. He owned gristmills and woollen mills and also took part in the lumber trade and banking. He also served as reeve for Uxbridge and was warden for Ontario County in 1883. Gould was elected by acclamation to the House of Commons in 1900 after the death of James David Edgar and reelected in the general election that followed later that year.

External links 

The Canadian parliamentary companion, 1885 JA Gemmill

1839 births
1915 deaths
Liberal Party of Canada MPs
Members of the House of Commons of Canada from Ontario
Ontario Liberal Party MPPs
People from Uxbridge, Ontario